The Eleventh Amendment of the Constitution of South Africa renamed the Northern Province to Limpopo, altered the procedure for intervention by the national government in a failing provincial government and intervention by a provincial government in a failing municipality, and expanded the powers of the provincial executive when it intervenes in a municipality.

The bill was passed by the National Assembly on 25 February 2003 with 305 votes in favour, more than the required two-thirds majority, and by the National Council of Provinces on 25 March with all nine provinces in favour. It was signed by President Thabo Mbeki on 9 April, and came into force on 11 July.

Formal title
The official short title of the amendment is "Constitution Eleventh Amendment Act of 2003". It was originally titled "Constitution of the Republic of South Africa Second Amendment Act, 2003" and numbered as Act No. 3 of 2003, but the Citation of Constitutional Laws Act, 2005 renamed it and abolished the practice of giving Act numbers to constitutional amendments.

References

External links

 Official text (PDF)

Amendments of the Constitution of South Africa
2003 in South African law